Karin MacDonald (born 16 May 1969) is an Australian politician and was a member of the Australian Capital Territory Legislative Assembly representing the electorate of Brindabella for the Labor Party. MacDonald was elected at the 2001 ACT general election and retired at the 2008 ACT general election.

MacDonald is Jewish. Her maternal grandparents were German Jews who fled just prior to the outbreak of WW2. Her father converted to Judaism when he married her mother.

References

Australian Labor Party members of the Australian Capital Territory Legislative Assembly
Members of the Australian Capital Territory Legislative Assembly
1969 births
Living people
Women members of the Australian Capital Territory Legislative Assembly
21st-century Australian politicians
21st-century Australian women politicians
Jewish Australian politicians